Pierre Harvey,  (born March 24, 1957) is a Canadian sports athlete. He was the first Canadian male athlete to compete in both the 1984 Summer Olympics (road cycling) and 1984 Winter Olympics (cross-country skiing).

Early life and career 

Born in Rimouski, Quebec, he won three gold medals in cross-country skiing in the 1979 Canada Winter Games.

First competing as a cyclist at the 1976 Summer Olympics in Montreal, Harvey finished 24th in the individual road race. He was also a silver medallist in the Road Race at the 1978 Commonwealth Games in Edmonton.

Competing in cross-country skiing from 1982 to 1988, Harvey's best finish at the FIS Nordic World Ski Championships was 16th in the 15 km event at Oslo in 1982. He would earn a total of three victories in his career, including a victory in the 50 km event at the Holmenkollen ski festival in 1988. As of 2010, he is the only Canadian to win any event at that prestigious competition.

At the 1984 Los Angeles Olympics, Harvey's job in the cycling road race was to act as wind breaker for his teammate Steve Bauer, who went on to win Olympic silver.

At the 1988 Winter Olympics in Calgary, he took the Athlete's Oath and finished 14th in the 30 km event.

He won the prestigious 54 km Birkebeinerrennet ski marathon in Norway in 1987, the first non-Scandinavian to do so.

Membership 
In 1988, he was made a Member of the Order of Canada. In 1992, he was inducted into the Canadian Ski Hall of Fame. Harvey was inducted in the Canadian Cycling Hall of Fame in 2006. In 2011, he was made a Knight of the National Order of Quebec. In 2014, Harvey was inducted into the Canada's Sports Hall of Fame.

His son, Alex Harvey, made the Canadian team for the 2010 Winter Olympics in Vancouver, the 2014 Winter Olympics in Sochi and the 2018 Winter Olympics in Pyeongchang.

Cross-country skiing results
All results are sourced from the International Ski Federation (FIS).

Olympic Games

World Championships

World Cup

Season standings

Individual podiums
3 victories  
4 podiums

See also
Université Laval

References

External links
 
 
 Holmenkollen winners since 1892 - click Vinnere for downloadable pdf file 
 Induction into the Canadian Cycling Hall of Fame
 IOC 1988 Winter Olympics

1957 births
Canadian male cross-country skiers
Canadian male cyclists
Cyclists at the 1976 Summer Olympics
Cyclists at the 1984 Summer Olympics
Cyclists from Quebec
Cross-country skiers at the 1984 Winter Olympics
Cross-country skiers at the 1988 Winter Olympics
Cyclists at the 1978 Commonwealth Games
Commonwealth Games silver medallists for Canada
Holmenkollen Ski Festival winners
Knights of the National Order of Quebec
Living people
Members of the Order of Canada
Olympic cyclists of Canada
Olympic cross-country skiers of Canada
People from Rimouski
Commonwealth Games medallists in cycling
Oath takers at the Olympic Games
Laval Rouge et Or athletes
Medallists at the 1978 Commonwealth Games